Switzerland participated in the Eurovision Song Contest 1979 in Israel. Peter, Sue and Marc and Pfuri, Gorps and Kniri represented Switzerland with the song "Trödler und Co". They finished on 10th place with 60 points.

Before Eurovision

Concours Eurovision 1979 
The final took place on 27 January 1979 and was held at the studios of DRS in Genève, hosted by Christian Heeb. The winner was chosen by 3 regional juries (DRS, TSR, TSI), a press jury, and a jury of experts.

At Eurovision
Switzerland performed 8th in the night, following Greece and preceding Germany. Group scored 60 points placing Switzerland 10th out of 19 entries.

The Swiss conductor at the contest was Rolf Zuckowski.

Voting

References

1979
Countries in the Eurovision Song Contest 1979
Eurovision